Kwanza is an album by Archie Shepp released on Impulse! in 1974. The album contains tracks recorded from September 1968 to August 1969 by Shepp with four different ensembles.

Reception
The AllMusic review by Thom Jurek stated: "Kwanza may not be one of Shepp's better known recordings, but it is certainly one of his fine ones".

Track listing
All compositions by Archie Shepp, except as indicated

 "Back Back" - 5:45
 "Spoo Pee Doo" - 2:38
 "New Africa" (Grachan Moncur III) - 12:50
 "Slow Drag" - 10:09
 "Bakai" (Cal Massey) - 9:59

Recorded September 9, 1968 (track 2), February 17, 1969 (track 1) August 26, 1969 (track 4) and February 26, 1969 (tracks 3 & 5).

Personnel
Archie Shepp - tenor saxophone, soprano saxophone
Martin Banks - trumpet, flugelhorn (track 2)
Robin Kenyatta - alto saxophone, flute (track 2)
Andrew Bey - piano (track 2)
Bert Payne - guitar (track 2)
Albert Winston - electric bass, bass (track 2)
Beaver Harris - drums (tracks 2, 3 & 5)
Leon Thomas - lead vocals (track 2)
Tasha Thomas, Doris Troy - backing vocals (track 2)
Jimmy Owens - trumpet (tracks 1, 3 & 5)
Grachan Moncur III - trombone (tracks 1, 3 & 5)
James Spaulding - alto saxophone (track 1)
Charles Davis - baritone saxophone (tracks 1, 3 & 5)
Dave Burrell - organ (track 1), piano (tracks 3 & 5)
Wally Richardson - guitar (track 1)
Bob Bushnell - electric bass (track 1)
Bernard Purdie - drums (track 1)
Walter Booker - bass (tracks 3 & 5)
Woody Shaw - trumpet (track 4)
Matthew Gee - trombone (track 4)
Clarence Sharpe - alto saxophone
Cecil Payne - baritone saxophone, flute (track 4)
Cedar Walton - piano (track 4)
Wilbur Ware - bass (track 4)
Joe Chambers - drums (track 4)

References

1974 albums
Archie Shepp albums
Impulse! Records albums
Albums produced by Bob Thiele